"Never Ever" is the twenty-first single by Ayumi Hamasaki, released on March 7, 2001. This is her third single in a row to be composed by herself. In mid-October 2007, the third track on this single "Seasons (H-H Remix)", six and a half years after its release, appeared as the third most downloaded song in Japan for that time, according to mu-mo.

Information 
"Never Ever" was released only three weeks before her first compilation album, A Best. Like the latter album, she was forced by her record label, avex, to release this single. Although she had already incorporated pop-rock music in her work, this song is considered as her first real attempt to pop-rock music.

Commercial endorsements 
"Never Ever" was used in a commercial for the Kirin Supli drinks. Hamasaki appeared in the TV ad.

Track listing 
 "Never Ever" (Original Mix) – 4:41
 "Never Ever" (Yuta's prayer mix)
 "Seasons (H-H Remix)"
 "Never Ever" (Project O.T. MIX)
 "Never Ever" (Laugh & Peace MIX)
 "Never Ever" (Empty Pot Shuttlecock Wood)
 "Evolution" (Ayu Can Hear U Mix)
 "Never Ever" (nicely nice hot stab remix)
 "Never Ever" (tears of aquarius mix)
 "Never Ever" (Original Mix -Instrumental-) – 4:41

Live performances 
March 9, 200: Music Station
March 10, 2001: CountDown TV
March 19, 2001: Hey! Hey! Hey!

Charts
Oricon Sales Chart (Japan)

 RIAJ certification: 3× Platinum

References

External links
 "Never Ever" information at Avex Network
 "Never Ever" information at Oricon

2001 singles
2001 songs
Avex Trax singles
Ayumi Hamasaki songs
Oricon Weekly number-one singles
Songs written by Ayumi Hamasaki